Slots Bjergby is a village on Zealand, Denmark. It is located in Slagelse Municipality.

Slots Bjergby Church

Slots Bjergby Church is built between 1050 and 1275. The oldest parts of the church are the nave and choir. Later extensions include sacristy, tower and church porch. The altarpiece is from 1742, made by carpenter Oluf Jacobsen. The pulpit is also made by Oluf Jacobsen. It was made in 1744. The chalice is from 1673.

Notable residents
 Ludvig Fenger (1833–1905), architect and proponent of the Historicist style

References

Cities and towns in Region Zealand
Slagelse Municipality
Villages in Denmark